Pry may refer to:

 Pry (software), an interactive shell for the Ruby programming language
 Polly Pry (1857–1938), reporter for the Denver Post 
 Paul Pry (play), an 1825 farce in three acts
 Pry bar, a crowbar
 Pry , A traditional English name for the small leaved lime tree Tilia cordata.

See also
 Sean O'Pry (born 1989), American male model
 PRY (disambiguation)
 Pries
 Prier